The Zeitgeschichtliches Forum Leipzig (English: Forum of Contemporary History) is a museum of contemporary German history. The museum was opened in 1999 and focuses on the history of the German division, everyday life in the communist dictatorship of the GDR, and the reunification process. It is located in the city center of Leipzig, Germany.

The permanent exhibition gives insight into the history of opposition and civil disobedience in the repressive one-party state of the Socialist Unity Party of Germany (SED). Furthermore, it focuses on the history of everyday life in the Soviet Occupation Zone and the GDR from the end of World War II in 1945 until the Peaceful Revolution of 1989 and German reunification. The fundamental revision of the permanent exhibition, completed in 2018, gives more space to the time period after the reunification. New topics are the successes and difficulties or growing together, international terrorism, digitization and globalization. 2000 objects, photos and films, as well as numerous interviews with eyewitnesses illustrate the recent history of Germany.

Alongside the permanent exhibition the museum displays several temporary exhibitions every year. Moreover, it organises lectures, readings, film screenings and other events on history. Its collection on GDR history comprises over 200,000 objects, for example the literary and artistic estate of Johannes Hegenbarth, author of GDR comic Mosaik. The museum is run by Haus der Geschichte foundation. Admission is free.

See also 
 Haus der Geschichte
 Tränenpalast
 Museum in the Kulturbrauerei

References

External links 

 

Museums in Leipzig
History museums in Germany